Orienbank is one of the oldest banks in Tajikistan, and one of its largest financial institutions. The bank is currently led by chairman Hasan Asadullozoda.

References

External links

 Official website

Banks of Tajikistan
1925 establishments in the Soviet Union
Banks established in 1925